This article lists political parties in Uzbekistan, a post-Soviet nation dominated by the supporters of the President of Uzbekistan. Despite small reforms and openness in the 2010s, no true opposition parties are allowed and every registered party supports the incumbent president and former prime minister Shavkat Mirziyoyev as well as the founder of the Republic of Uzbekistan and former president Islam Karimov.

Parliamentary parties 

 Source

Banned parties 
 Birdamlik – full name is Birdamlik People's Democratic Party
 Erk Democratic Party
 Unity

Former parties 
 Communist Party of Uzbekistan
 Self-Sacrifice National Democratic Party

See also 
 List of political parties by country

References

Bibliography 
 
 

 
Newspapers
Uzbekistan
Uzbekistan
Political parties